The administrative divisions of India are subnational administrative units of India; they are composed of a nested hierarchy of administrative divisions.

Indian states and territories frequently use different local titles for the same level of subdivision (e.g., the mandals of Andhra Pradesh  and Telangana correspond to tehsils of Uttar Pradesh and other Hindi-speaking states but to talukas of Gujarat, Goa, Karnataka, Kerala, Maharashtra, and Tamil Nadu).

The smaller subdivisions (villages and blocks) exist only in rural areas. In urban areas, urban local bodies exist instead of these rural subdivisions.

Tiers of India

The diagram below outlines the six tiers of government:

Zones and regions

Zones

The states of India have been grouped into six zones having an Advisory Council "to develop the habit of cooperative working" among these States. Zonal Councils were set up vide Part-III of the States Reorganisation Act, 1956. The North Eastern States' special problems are addressed by another statutory body - The North Eastern Council, created by the North Eastern Council Act, 1971. The present composition of each of these Zonal Councils is as under:

Northern Zonal Council, comprising Chandigarh, Delhi, Haryana, Himachal Pradesh, Jammu and Kashmir, Ladakh, Punjab, and Rajasthan;
North Eastern Council, comprising Assam, Arunachal Pradesh, Manipur, Meghalaya, Mizoram, Nagaland and Tripura; The State of Sikkim has also been included in the North Eastern Council vide North Eastern Council (Amendment) Act, 2002 notified on 23 December 2002.
Central Zonal Council, comprising the States of Chhattisgarh, Madhya Pradesh, Uttarakhand and Uttar Pradesh;
Eastern Zonal Council, comprising Bihar, Jharkhand, Odisha, and West Bengal;
Western Zonal Council, comprising Dadra and Nagar Haveli and Daman and Diu, Goa, Gujarat, and Maharashtra;
Southern Zonal Council, comprising Andhra Pradesh, Karnataka, Kerala, Puducherry, Tamil Nadu, and Telangana. 
Andaman and Nicobar Islands, Lakshadweep are not members of any of the Zonal Councils. However, they are presently special invitees to the Southern Zonal Council

Cultural zones
Each zone has a zonal headquarters where a zonal cultural center has been established. Several states have membership in multiple zones, but no state subdivisions are utilized in the zonal divisions. In addition to promoting the culture of the zones they are responsible for, each zonal center also works to cross-promote and create exposure to other cultural zones of India by organizing functions and inviting artistes from other zones.

States and union territories 

India is composed of 28 states and eight union territories (including a national capital territory).

Autonomous administrative divisions

The Sixth Schedule of the Constitution of India allows for the formation of autonomous administrative divisions which have been given autonomy within their respective states.

Presently, 10 Autonomous Councils in Assam, Meghalaya, Mizoram and Tripura are formed by virtue of the Sixth Schedule with the rest being formed as a result of other legislation.

Divisions 

Many of the Indian states are subdivided into divisions, which have official administrative governmental status, and each division is headed by a senior IAS officer called Divisional Commissioner.

As of September 2022, divisions exist in 18 of the 28 states and 3 of the 8 union territories. As of September 2022, there are a total of 102 divisions in India.

Districts 

States and territories (or divisions) are further subdivided into districts (zilla), of which there are 766 (as of Aug 2022). Each District is headed by an IAS officer called District Magistrate.

Subdistricts

Rural level

Blocks 

The Community Development Block also known as CD Block or just block, is often the next level of administrative division (for development purposes, whereas tehsil is next to the district for revenue purposes).

Villages 
Villages are often the lowest level of subdivisions in India. The governmental bodies at the village level are called Gram Panchayat, of which there were an estimated 256,000 in 2002.
Each Gram Panchayat covers a large village or a cluster of smaller villages with a combined population exceeding 500 Gram Sabha. Clusters of villages are also sometimes called Hobli or Patti.

Habitations 
Certain governmental functions and activities - including clean water availability, rural development, and education - are tracked at a sub-village level. These hamlets are termed "habitations". India is composed of 1,714,556 habitations  In some states, most villages have a single habitation; in others (notably Kerala and Tripura) there is a high ratio of habitations to villages.

Metropolitan area

A metro area usually comprises multiple jurisdictions and municipalities: neighbourhoods, townships, cities, exurbs, suburbs, counties, districts, states, and even nations like the eurodistricts. 
As social, economic, and political institutions have changed, metropolitan areas have become key economic and political regions.
Metropolitan areas include one or more urban areas, as well as satellite cities, towns, and intervening rural areas that are socio-economically tied to the urban core, typically measured by commuting patterns
The metropolitan cities of India are: Mumbai, Delhi, Kolkata, Chennai, Bangalore, Hyderabad, Ahmedabad, Vishakhapatnam and Pune.

Historical administrative divisions 
 Chakla
 Pargana
 Sarkar
 Subah

See also 
 Autonomous administrative divisions of India
 Cultural Zones of India
 States and union territories of India

References

External links
 CityMayors.com

Administrative divisions of India
Community development blocks in West Bengal